Ophidian Wheel is the third full-length album by the Greek death metal band Septic Flesh. In 2013, a reissue containing bonus tracks and new artwork was released through Season of Mist.

Musically, this album is much more straightforward than previous albums, fusing an aggressive death metal style with elements of gothic rock. Though someone named "Kostas" is credited for drums, all drums on this album were programmed.

Track listing
All lyrics written by Sotiris V.

Personnel 
 Septic Flesh – production
 Spiros A. – bass, vocals, artwork
 Sotiris V. – guitars, vocals, keyboards
 Christos A. – guitars, keyboards

 Additional musicians 
 Natalie Rassoulis – vocals
 Kostas – drums

 Production 
 Lambros Sfiris – production, engineering

1997 albums
Septicflesh albums
Albums with cover art by Spiros Antoniou
Albums by Greek artists
Holy Records albums
Season of Mist albums